Gergely Geri (born 19 January 1977) is a Slovak professional football head coach and former player. Since January 2023, he is an assistant of Ivan Galád in Zlaté Moravce

References

External links
 Futbalnet profile
 
 Fortuna Liga profile

1977 births
Living people
People from Trebišov District
Sportspeople from the Košice Region
Slovak footballers
Slovak football managers
Association football defenders
FK Slavoj Trebišov players
MŠK Rimavská Sobota players
ŠK Futura Humenné players
MFK Zemplín Michalovce players
Nyíregyháza Spartacus FC players
MŠK Novohrad Lučenec players
FK Železiarne Podbrezová managers
FC Nitra managers
ŠKF iClinic Sereď managers
FK Pohronie managers
FK Slavoj Trebišov managers
Slovak Super Liga players
Slovak Super Liga managers
Expatriate football managers in Hungary
Slovak expatriate sportspeople in Hungary
Diósgyőri VTK managers
Nemzeti Bajnokság I managers